Edwards Creek may refer to:

Edwards Creek (Churchill County, Nevada)
Edwards Creek (Washington)